Olga Genrikhovna Sedakova (born 6 March 1972) is a former Russian synchronized swimmer who competed at two Olympic Games, won three gold medals in the World Championships, and nine golds at the European Championships. In 2019, she was inducted to the International Swimming Hall of Fame.

Soviet and Unified Team
Sedakova's first major international competition was the 1991 World Championships held at Perth in January, where although she failed to win a medal, she placed fourth in both the solo and duet competitions, where she partnered with Gana Maximova. The 1991 European Aquatics Championships, held in Athens the following August was her breakout success- she swept the synchronized swimming events, winning gold medals in the solo competition, the duet competition with partner Anna Kozlova, and the team competition.

After the break-up of the Soviet Union, the former Soviet states (except the Baltic states) competed together at the 1992 Summer Olympics in Barcelona as the Unified Team.  As part of the Unified Team, Sedakova competed in both the solo and duet routines- again partnering with Kozlova. During the competition, Sedakova and Koslava's coach quit on them leaving them to finish the competition alone. Sedakova placed fourth in both events; Following Barcelona both events were dropped from the Olympic program and replaced with a team competition.

Russia
Russia competed as an independent country at the 1993 European Aquatics Championships in Sheffield, and Sedakova again completed her trifecta winning gold medals in all three events contested.  The 1993 European Championships would be Sedakova's last partnering in the duet with Anna Kozlova, as Kozlova defected to the United States shortly after the competition.  At the 1994 World Championships, Sedakova again placed fourth in the solo competition.

In Vienna, for the 1995 European Aquatics Championships, Sedakova again won the gold medal in solo competition, as well as the team gold with Russia.  Also in 1995, at the World Cup in Atlanta, she won two bronze medals, in the solo and team competitions.  She returned to Atlanta to compete in the 1996 Summer Olympics, where the Russian team finished in fourth place.

Sedakova experienced her first victory on a global stage at the 1997 World Cup in Guangzhou, where she won the solo competition, and the duet competition with new partner Olga Brusnikina.  That same year, at the 1997 European Aquatics Championships, she won her fourth consecutive solo gold medal, the most by any swimmer in that discipline.

She returned to Perth for the 1998 World Aquatics Championships, where she experienced the greatest success in her career.  She won gold in all three events contested; the solo competition, the duet with Olga Brusnikina, and the team competition.  Sedakova was only the fourth person to sweep every event at a single championships, following Teresa Andersen in the first World Aquatics Championships in 1973, Carolyn Waldo in 1986, and Becky Dyroen-Lancer at the previous competition in 1994.  Despite her resounding success, it would be her last major competition.

References

1972 births
Living people
Swimmers from Moscow
Soviet synchronized swimmers
Russian synchronized swimmers
Synchronized swimmers at the 1992 Summer Olympics
Olympic synchronized swimmers of the Unified Team
Synchronized swimmers at the 1996 Summer Olympics
Olympic synchronized swimmers of Russia
Synchronized swimmers at the 1991 World Aquatics Championships
Synchronized swimming coaches